Escape Dead Island is an adventure survival horror video game developed by Swedish developer Fatshark, published by German studio Deep Silver and distributed by Square Enix in North America for PS3 and Xbox 360 and Valve for PC. It is the second Dead Island spin-off. 

Escape Dead Island is a survival mystery game that follows the story of Cliff Calo, who sets sail to document the unexplained events rumored to have happened on Banoi. Arriving on the island of Narapela, part of the Banoi archipelago, he finds that not everything is as it seems.

Gameplay
Escape Dead Island is a third-person action-adventure video game with an emphasis on stealth and melee combat, with some gunplay. Players can crouch to sneak up on enemies and execute them from behind, or engage enemies in melee by swinging a melee weapon at them. Melee utilizes light attacks, heavy attacks, and a dodge move. Specific enemies can be locked onto to focus the camera and the player's attacks on them. A silenced pistol and a shotgun are available and can be aimed and fired from an over-the-shoulder third-person perspective, but ammo is limited. The game lacks the RPG-like elements of the main Dead Island games; there are no player levels, and weapon selection is non-customizable, with weapons being collected at fixed points in the game's story. As a journalist, the player character carries a camera that can be used to take pictures of significant objects in the game environment, causing the character to comment on them. The player character's deteriorating mental state plays a significant role in gameplay, with many unreal events occurring such as buildings falling from the sky, or the player abruptly transporting from one location to another when attempting to cross a room. The game uses a cel-shaded graphics style.

Plot

The game initially opens 2 days prior to the Banoi Island zombie outbreak, with the player controlling "Kilo Two", a covert operative working with Dead Island protagonist Xian Mei (who provides support over the radio) to infiltrate a Geopharm facility on the island of Narapela and assassinate a mole. Despite unexpectedly finding the facility overrun by zombies, Kilo Two succeeds in killing the mole and obtaining a copy of the Geopharm data the mole was attempting to steal. However, he is prevented from leaving due to the zombie outbreak escaping the facility and spilling out onto the island, so he instead hides the USB flash drive containing the data before being attacked off-screen by a massive creature.

Meanwhile, it is revealed that Geopharm is responsible for creating the zombie virus, and are part of a global conspiracy known as the Palm Garden Order. The mole was working together with the terrorist hacker Charon, who has also infiltrated the Palm Garden Order. The mole wanted to release the data to the public and expose the Palm Garden Order, but Charon (who blames the PGO for the death of his father) instead wants to destroy the PGO with their own zombie virus.

The plot moves ahead 6 months, with the island of Banoi still cut off from the outside world by the world's governments, who have suppressed news about the zombie outbreak. Aspiring journalist Cliff Calo, the son of an influential broadcasting executive, and his two friends Linda Waterson and Devan Mavropani, arrive on Narapela hoping to uncover the truth behind the events on Banoi. Cliff is resentful due to his father passing him up for promotion in favor of his sister, and has decided to start his own independent journalism outlet with Devan and Linda. The three of them find the island apparently deserted, and after some investigation they locate a mass grave. The dead bodies abruptly begin to re-animate, and Linda is attacked and bitten by a zombie. Soon afterwards, the three of them witness a small single-engine airplane crash lands on the island. Devan carries the injured Linda to a mobile camp on top of the island's central mountain in hopes of finding safety, while Cliff goes to investigate the plane crash. Cliff soon begins to receive radio messages from Linda, reassuring him that everything is OK and encouraging him on his progress.

Cliff reaches an airfield where the plane crashed and meets up with its pilot, Xian Mei, who seems to have survived the cliffhanger ending of Dead Island: Riptide and has come to the island searching for Kilo Two and the Geopharm data. She informs Cliff that there is a secret lab on the island, which may have a cure for the zombie outbreak. Speaking to Cliff over the radio, Xian Mei guides him to collecting 3 keycards needed to access the lab. While exploring the island, Cliff begins to experience hallucinations which increase in frequency and intensity as the game progresses.

After passing out from one such hallucination, Cliff wakes up at the mobile camp just in time to witness Linda being carried away by the same massive mutant who attacked Kilo Two in the prologue. Devan appears and insists the two of them attempt to escape, stating that Linda was barely alive and will not survive, and criticizing Cliff for abandoning her while she was injured. When Cliff insists he was in communication with her over the radio, Devan reveals that he and Linda never had a radio. After an intense argument, Devan goes off to find a boat to escape the island, while Cliff attempts to pursue Linda and find the cure.

Following the giant mutant, Cliff is led to the secret lab, where he locates the data drive hidden there by Kilo Two. He discovers the mutant is Dr. Aaron Welles, a Geopharm scientist who was infected by the virus but has undergone a unique mutation and retained his intelligence, albeit at some cost to his sanity (a concept explored in the Dead Island: Epidemic multiplayer game). Aaron and another Geopharm scientist, Faith Kimball, attempt to test a cure on Linda, but the cure is unsuccessful, implying that Linda has died. Enraged, Cliff foolishly attacks Aaron and is forced to flee from the massive mutant.

Cliff's hallucinations increase, and it becomes clear the voice of Linda he's been hearing over the radio is another hallucination. This voice begins to taunt and mock him for his mistakes and failures. Xian Mei contacts Cliff and warns him that she has planted explosives all around the island, and will soon detonate them to stop the outbreak. She tells him to leave the island, but Cliff insists on staying to find and rescue Devan. Cliff is unable to locate Devan, but is contacted over the radio by his father, who is arriving by helicopter searching for him. Cliff refuses to leave the island with his father, still hoping to find and save Devan, so Cliff's father instead asks him to give him the data drive so he can broadcast the truth to the world. However, Cliff is resentful of his father, feeling that he wants to take the credit for the discovery for himself, and refuses.

Cliff is contacted by Dr. Kimball, who tells him that Devan is with her, and to meet with them at the office of Geopharm's founder, Emery Crown. Evading Aaron, Cliff reaches the office, where Dr. Kimball explains that she has the cure for the virus and has no choice but to test it on Cliff. She then releases Devan, already a zombie, who bites Cliff before collapsing. Kimball tells Cliff he has no choice but to take the cure serum, but Cliff passes out and experiences a complete psychotic break from reality. Navigating through a surreal, heavily distorted version of the game's events, Cliff kills zombie versions of Linda and himself, defeats a hallucinatory Aaron, and locates a mental representation of the serum. Kneeling next to a convulsing Devan, Cliff apologizes before injecting one of them with the serum (the camera pans away before showing which one).

The game ends with Cliff on the beach of Narapela, releasing a flotation case into the ocean containing the data drive and his own narrated account of events. He is called back to the island by the voice of Linda. The floatation case drifts out into the ocean, and after the credits roll the plot loops back to the beginning of the game, with the flotation case passing by the boat Cliff and his friends are using to reach Narapela island. This time loop and many other strange events throughout the game imply the entire game is some sort of hallucination on Cliff's part.

Reception

Escape Dead Island received mixed to negative reviews from critics upon release. Review aggregator Metacritic gave the Microsoft Windows version 52/100 based on 23 reviews, the PlayStation 3 version 40/100 based on 25 reviews, and the Xbox 360 version 32/100 based on 12 reviews.

Eric L. Patterson from Electronic Gaming Monthly gave the game a 7.5/10, praising the comic-book-style visuals, unique graphical styles, refreshing ideas, as well as the third-person perspective. He stated that "I want more games like Escape Dead Island—games that don't have to be perfect or gigantic blockbusters and can just be fun experiences that understand what their place in the world should be."

Scott Butterworth from IGN gave the game a 6.8/10, stating that "While Escape Dead Islands workmanlike combat and ho-hum zombies fail to fully capitalize on this unoriginal but respectably executed premise, it does manage to punctuate its enjoyable filler with some genuinely spectacular moments of madness."

James Kozanitis from Hardcore Gamer gave the game a 1/5, saying, "Escape Dead Island squandered whatever opportunity it had to make a compelling story, while offering only sub-par gameplay to tide you over in the meantime. It has no business being a game, rather than a one-shot graphic novel for dedicated fans."

Tim Turi of Game Informer gave the game a 2/10, criticizing the frustrating mission structure, poor textures, combat system and animations, the lack of variety in terms of enemy type, unlikable characters and low replay value. He stated that "Escape Dead Islands single-player adventure is plagued with enough technical and design horrors that every copy of the game should be sealed shut and stamped with enough biohazard symbols to keep innocent fans of the series away."

Justin McElroy from Polygon declared it "the worst game I've ever finished", calling it a failure in its attempts at stealth, survival horror and action.

References

External links

2014 video games
Adventure games
Deep Silver games
2010s horror video games
Experimental medical treatments in fiction
Fiction about mind control
Interquel video games
Mystery video games
PlayStation 3 games
Single-player video games
Survival video games
Stealth video games
Video games developed in Sweden
Video games with cel-shaded animation
Video games with downloadable content
Video games set in Oceania
Video games set on fictional islands
Windows games
Xbox 360 games
Video games about zombies
Fatshark games